The 2008–09 Utah State Aggies men's basketball team represented Utah State University in the 2008–09 college basketball season. This was head coach Stew Morrill's 11th season at Utah State. The Aggies played their home games at the Dee Glen Smith Spectrum and were members of the Western Athletic Conference. They finished the season 30–5, 14–2 to capture the regular season championship for the second straight year. They also won the 2009 WAC men's basketball tournament to earn an automatic bid to the 2009 NCAA Division I men's basketball tournament. As No. 11 seed in the West Region, they lost to No. 6 seed and AP #23 Marquette in the first round.

Roster 

Source

Schedule and results

|-
!colspan=9 style=| Non-conference regular season

|-
!colspan=9 style=| WAC Regular Season

|-
!colspan=9 style=| WAC tournament

|-
!colspan=10 style=| NCAA tournament

Source

Rankings

References

Utah State
Utah State Aggies men's basketball seasons
Utah State
Aggies
Aggies